Volodymyr Mazyar (born 28 September 1977) is a Ukrainian football manager and a former player. From 2011 to July 2022, he was the manager of Akzhayik in Kazakhstan.

Career
He worked a manager for FC Akzhayik. In 2013–15, he worked a manager of the Stal Dniprodzerzhynsk. He played as a center forward.

Career statistics

References

External links
Statistics at FFU website

Ukrainian footballers
Ukraine under-21 international footballers
Ukrainian expatriate footballers
Ukrainian Premier League players
FC Skala Stryi (1911) players
FC Hazovyk Komarno players
FC Kryvbas Kryvyi Rih players
FC Kryvbas-2 Kryvyi Rih players
FC Dynamo-2 Kyiv players
FC Dynamo-3 Kyiv players
FC Hazovyk-Skala Stryi players
FC Lviv players
FC Vorskla Poltava players
FC Vorskla-2 Poltava players
FC Dnipro players
FC Dnipro-2 Dnipropetrovsk players
FC Dnipro-3 Dnipropetrovsk players
FC Stal Kamianske players
FC Hoverla Uzhhorod players
FC Oleksandriya players
SC Tavriya Simferopol players
FC Arsenal-Kyivshchyna Bila Tserkva players
1977 births
Living people
Expatriate footballers in Azerbaijan
Ukrainian expatriate sportspeople in Azerbaijan
Simurq PIK players
Ukrainian football managers
FC Stal Kamianske managers
NK Veres Rivne managers
FC Rukh Lviv managers
Association football forwards
FC Polissya Zhytomyr managers
FC Akzhayik managers
Ukrainian expatriate football managers
Expatriate footballers in Kazakhstan
Expatriate football managers in Kazakhstan
Ukrainian expatriate sportspeople in Kazakhstan
FC Hirnyk-Sport Horishni Plavni managers
FC Lviv managers
Sportspeople from Khmelnytskyi Oblast